Crakehall is a village and civil parish in the Hambleton District of North Yorkshire, England, approximately  west of Bedale. More known as Thomas Barkers home grounds. The village lies along the route of the A684 and is split into two parts by Bedale Beck, a tributary of the River Swale. The population was estimated at 630 in 2015. The north-west part is known as Little Crakehall, and the south-east part as Great Crakehall.

The parish also includes the hamlet of Kirkbridge, a mile east of Great Crakehall.

History

The village is mentioned in the Domesday Book as Crachele. It was part of the head manor of Masham. The manor lands were split between Gilli and Ulfkil before the Norman conquest. After 1086 the manor was tenanted to two men-at-arms of the household of Count Alan of Brittany. The line of descent for the manor follows that of Ribald of Middleham, whose main tenants were named 'Crakehall', until 1624. From then it was granted by the Crown to Edward and Robert Ramsay until they granted it to John Heath and John White around 1658. Records thereafter are unclear until mention of the manor being in the possession of the Place family in the early 18th century. From 1732 to 1810 the manor was passed from Henry Goddard via Mary Turner, Watson Bowman and Anthony Hardolph Eyre to Henry Pulleine. Pulleine's granddaughter, Lady Cowell, inherited in the late 19th century. That part of the manor that was in Little Crakehall was held by the 'Crakehall' Family until the 14th century and it eventually passed to Christopher Conyers of Hornby whose descent it followed thereafter.

The etymology of the name of the village is made of the Old Norse word kráka meaning crow or raven and the Anglian word halh meaning a nook of land. Kráka could also have been the given name to a person.

On the Bedale Beck is the 17th-century corn mill, once owned by the Neville family of Middleham Castle. The mill closed in 1930 and lay derelict until it was restored in 1980. It is open in the summer.

The Northallerton to Hawes branch line of the North Eastern Railway passes to the south of the village. Crakehall railway station served the village until 1954, located where the Station Cottages now stand. The Wensleydale Railway now runs over the same track.

Geography and governance

Crakehall Beck becomes Bedale Beck as it passes through the village. Bedale Beck is a tributary of the River Swale  to the east of the village. The smaller settlements of Kirkbridge, Langthorne and Patrick Brompton all lie within a mile of the village.

The village lies within the UK Parliamentary constituency of Richmond (Yorkshire). It also lies within the Bedale electoral division of North Yorkshire County Council and the Crakehall ward of Hambleton District Council. The Parish Council has six members, five represent Crakehall and one for Langthorne. The population of this ward at the Census 2011 was 1,728.

Demography

2001 Census

According to the 2001 UK Census, the parish was 48.2% male and 51.8% female of the total population of 655. The religious make-up was 87.5% Christian with the rest stating no religion. The ethnic distribution was 100% White  There were 297 dwellings.

2011 Census

According to the 2011 UK Census, the parish had a total population of 677 with 49.3% male and 50.7% female. The religious make-up was 78.3% Christian, a small Jewish minority with the rest stating no religion. The ethnic distribution was 99.8% White with a small Mixed Ethnic minority. There were 300 dwellings. The wider electoral ward had the greatest proportion of White British residents of any in the whole of England.

Community

Crakehall CE Primary School provides education from age 5 to 11. It is a Voluntary Controlled establishment with a pupil capacity of 90. The school is within the catchment area of Bedale High School for secondary education between age 11 and 16. The village is served by a mobile Post Office which visits three times a week. There is one public house in the village, The Bay Horse. The village field a weekend Cricket team in the Nidderdale League and a midweek evening team in the Wensleydale League.

Religion

The church in the village is dedicated to St Gregory and was built in 1839–1840. It is part of the Deanery of Wensley and the Archdeaconry of Richmond. The Wesleyan chapel on Station Road was built at the same time in the village, but has now moved to a newer building opposite built in 1935. The Primitive Methodists had a chapel in Little Crakehall built in 1855.

Notable buildings

Crakehall Hall, built in 1732, is situated in the village overlooking the 5-acre village green. It was once the country seat of the Duke of Leeds, who lived at Kiveton Park in South Yorkshire. It is a Grade II* listed building.

The White Cross is a Grade II listed medieval cross which stands at the side of the A684.

Notable people

Rev Thomas Milville Raven FRSE (1828-1896) pioneer photographer, was vicar of Crakehall from 1867.

References

External links

 History of Crakehall

Villages in North Yorkshire
Civil parishes in North Yorkshire
Wensleydale